Minhaz Khan (born 17 December 1991) is a Bangladeshi cricketer. He made his first-class debut for Dhaka Division in the 2016–17 National Cricket League on 20 December 2016. He made his List A debut for Shinepukur Cricket Club in the 2017–18 Dhaka Premier Division Cricket League on 15 February 2018. He made his Twenty20 debut for Uttara Sporting Club in the 2018–19 Dhaka Premier Division Twenty20 Cricket League on 26 February 2019.

References

External links
 

1991 births
Living people
Bangladeshi cricketers
Dhaka Division cricketers
Shinepukur Cricket Club cricketers
Uttara Sporting Club cricketers
Place of birth missing (living people)